Arenimonas metalli is a Gram-negative, aerobic and rod-shaped bacterium from the genus of Arenimonas which has been isolated from the Hongshan Iron Mine from Daye in China.

References

Xanthomonadales
Bacteria described in 2012